The Frank Method is a method for packing tobacco into a smoking pipe initially developed by Achim Frank for use in pipe smoking competitions.

The Frank method involves compacting the tobacco from the sides without compressing the top.  This process leads to a firm layer of tobacco at the top of the pipe bowl with a looser layer beneath, without over-compressing the top layer.  This firm top layer and looser bottom layer produce a long burn with fewer re-lights, suitable for competition smoking or general pipe smoking.

See also
Pipe smoking

External links
 http://estatepipes.co.uk/shop/frank-method - Description of method and videos made by Achim Frank describing the method.

Pipe smoking

Also when Frank has his Vape its when he drips oil directly into the coil to make larger clouds.